Ian Lester Howell (born 20 May 1958) is a South African cricket umpire. As a player, he played first-class cricket for Border and Eastern Province in South Africa. A left-hand batsman and a left-arm medium bowler he played 119 first-class games scoring 3767 runs with 5 hundreds and 13 fifties and a batting average of 26.90. His top score was 115 not out. He took 243 first-class wickets with 5 five-wicket hauls with a best of 6/38 and a bowling average of 35.74.

Umpiring career
Howell has been a member of the International Cricket Council's panel of International Umpires since 2002. He is eligible to officiate in ODI's in South Africa as the home umpire, and as the TV umpire in Test matches. In December 2006 he replaced Mark Benson on-field during a Test match in Centurion when Benson was taken to hospital with heart palpitations, making him the first person to umpire in a Test match in his native country since the introduction of the Elite Panel of umpires in 2002. Howell is also regularly appointed by the ICC to stand in Test matches and ODI's away from South Africa to support the ICC Elite umpire panel at busy times in the cricket calendar. Howell was also appointed to the group stage of the 2007 Cricket World Cup in the West Indies, and officiated in the inaugural Twenty20 World Championship which took place in his native South Africa.

See also
 List of Test cricket umpires
 List of One Day International cricket umpires
 List of Twenty20 International cricket umpires

References

1958 births
Living people
South African Test cricket umpires
South African One Day International cricket umpires
South African Twenty20 International cricket umpires
Border cricketers
Eastern Province cricketers
South African cricketers